The Inter Baku 2013–14 season was Inter Baku's thirteenth Azerbaijan Premier League season, and their fifth season under manager Kakhaber Tskhadadze. They started the season competing in the 2013–14 UEFA Europa League, defeating Mariehamn before losing to Tromsø in the second qualifying round. They reached the Quarterfinals of the Azerbaijan Cup, losing to Neftchi Baku, and finished 2nd in the League.

Squad

Transfers

Summer

In:

 
 

 

 

Out:

Winter

In:

 
 
 

Out:

Competitions

Friendlies

Azerbaijan Premier League

Results summary

Results by round

Results

League table

Azerbaijan Cup

UEFA Europa League

Qualifying phase

Squad statistics

Appearances and goals

|-
|colspan="14"|Players who appeared for Inter Baku no longer at the club:

|}

Goal scorers

Disciplinary record

References
Inter Baku played their home match at Bayil Stadium, Baku as their own Shafa Stadium does not meet UEFA criteria.

External links 
 Inter Baku at Soccerway.com

Inter
Shamakhi FK seasons